David Starobin (born September 27, 1951) is a highly honored figure in the world of classical guitar. Called "arguably the most influential American classical guitarist of the 20th century" (Soundboard), 

Starobin was born in New York City.  and he records for Bridge Records.

References

External links
 Profile, Bridge Records

American classical guitarists
American male guitarists
1951 births
Living people
Manhattan School of Music faculty
Musicians from New Rochelle, New York
Guitarists from New York City
20th-century American guitarists
Classical musicians from New York (state)
20th-century American male musicians
Curtis Institute of Music faculty
Peabody Institute alumni
American composers
American record producers